Mary Ellen Hombs was the deputy director of the U.S. Interagency Council on Homelessness, a governmental entity that is made up of the heads of various federal departments and agencies with the mission of developing a comprehensive federal approach to end homelessness.  She served from 2003 to 2009.

Hombs was the primary author of Homelessness in America: A Forced March to Nowhere with Mitch Snyder.  She was an important member of the Community for Creative Non-Violence during the 1970s and 1980s, along with Snyder, Carol Fennelly, Harold Moss, and Lin Romano. A 1981 Washington Post article featuring the efforts of Hombs, spoke of her sacrificing dreams of a career, marriage, or normal middle-class lifestyle in order to serve the Washington, D.C. homeless population seven days a week, three hundred and sixty-five days per year.  Hombs stated her goal as convincing churches and the government to provide shelters enticing enough that “even the most isolated, the most hardened person could feel the desire to come out of the cold.”  She assisted the CCNV by cooking meals to feed over six hundred people a day and helping run the organization's Drop-In Center.

In 1995, Mary Ellen Hombs donated her papers to the Special Collections Research Center of The George Washington University. The collection is composed of correspondence, reports, photographs, articles, flyers, and court documents, much of which is related to the work of the CCNV.

Selected works 

 AIDS Crisis in America: A Reference Handbook by Mary Ellen Hombs, Eric K. Lerner, Hardcover, Abc-Clio Inc,  (1-57607-070-0) 1992
 American Homelessness: A Reference Handbook by Mary Ellen Hombs, Hardcover, Abc-Clio Inc,  (1-57607-247-9) 1990
 Homelessness in America: A Forced March to Nowhere by Mary Ellen Hombs, Softcover, Community for Creative,  (0-686-39879-3) 1982
 Welfare Reform: A Reference Handbook by Mary Ellen Hombs, Hardcover, Abc-Clio Inc,  (0-87436-844-8) 1996

References

External links
 Guide to the Mary Ellen Hombs Papers, 1971-1986, Special Collections Research Center, Estelle and Melvin Gelman Library, The George Washington University

Living people
Year of birth missing (living people)